The Euclid Avenue Historic District is a historic district in downtown Cleveland, Ohio, United States.  Established and listed on the National Register of Historic Places in 2002, it comprises  along Euclid Avenue and parallel streets from Public Square to East 21st Street.  In 2007, another  was added to the district; the boundary increase included buildings exclusively located along parallel streets.  it was again enlarged in 2022.

References

Downtown Cleveland
Historic districts in Cleveland
National Register of Historic Places in Cleveland, Ohio
Historic districts on the National Register of Historic Places in Ohio